This is a list of characters in the animated television series The Critic.

Overview

The Sherman family

Jay Sherman

Voiced by Jon Lovitz
"New York's third most popular early-morning cable-TV film critic", 37-year-old Jay Prescott Sherman is the host of Phillips Broadcasting's Coming Attractions. His catch phrases include his exclamation of surprise ("Hotchie motchie!"), his common putdown of sub-par films ("It stinks!") and his distinctive cough/sneeze ("Achem!"). He is known for his surly and sarcastic putdowns of nearly every film he sees (an act that has earned him disdain from the public and rather low ratings). His favorite films are usually Golden-Age classics (Citizen Kane and Mr. Smith Goes to Washington) and foreign films such as The Red Balloon. He often uses the "Shermometer" to measure the films he reviews, or a list of diseases he would rather have than see a movie. He has been known to rate films on a numerical scale, in which his highest score is seven out of ten. Most of his dislike for films comes from a love for cinema that has been disillusioned by seeing the commercialism that has overtaken the film industry.

Jay is the adopted son of wealthy New-England socialites Franklin and Eleanor Sherman, who originally thought he was a monkey. He is ethnically Jewish, but did not have a religious upbringing. His date of birth is shown on his driver's license as January 26, 1957. In preschool, he was given LSD-laced Kool-Aid by guest speaker Timothy Leary (he claimed afterwards, he "was down at the hungry i, jamming with Dylan"), and was mistakenly sent to Attica Prison instead of summer camp as a child in the summer of 1972. He has a teenage sister named Margo and a 13-year-old son named Marty who visits often when not staying with Jay's ex-wife Ardeth.

Jay has also held several other jobs in his time, including a truck driver, speech writer for Duke's presidential campaign and a writer for the film Ghostchasers III (renamed Ghostbusters III during the final episode clip show).

Jay has won a string of prestigious awards for his career: two Pulitzer Prizes for criticism, a People's Choice Award, five Golden Globes, an Emmy Award, a PhD in film, and a B'nai B'rith Award.

Jay blames his weight problem on the fictional disorder "vitilardo", a wordplay on the skin pigmentation disorder vitiligo. His weight is suggested to be greater than a tank, as a helicopter that was originally designed to lift tanks was unable to even get him off the ground. He was also shown in a file photo on a news report as "weighing more than the entire band Los Lobos", in which he is sitting on a see-saw, lifting the entire band into the air. When he exercises, Duke often uses Jay in place of a set of dumbbells when lifting weights. His weight led to the death of a horse when he was a child, crushing it to death when Jay lied to the horse trainer about his weight so he could sit on it. Jay's stomach seems to have a mind of its own, often giving him commands that he obeys out of fear, going so far as to call it "Master". Acting on the advice of a quack public-relations expert, Jay once gained so much weight that he had to have several years worth of liposuction.

Jay is a heterosexual whose sexual and romantic relationships with women are the subject of most plotlines on the series. However, his artistic interests and effeminate mannerisms often make Jay the target of anti-gay insults from others, especially Duke; despite mainly being a parody of the liberal Ted Turner, Duke often stands in for a stereotypical "Southern redneck" personality and is depicted as bigoted against minorities and bullying in his choice of words.

It is strongly hinted in the episode "Eyes on the Prize" that Jay is bipolar, when he tells a class of cab drivers that the only thing that gets him through the day is lithium, as well as in the episode "Sherman, Woman and Child" when his daily schedule reads "7:00 MANIC 8:00 DEPRESSIVE 9:00 MANIC 10:00 DEPRESSIVE."

He also has an alter-ego in "Ethel"; Ethel is an elderly woman, whom he often pretends is his assistant/secretary, and therefore assumes her persona when answering the phone. "Ethel" only appears in the first season.

In the second first-season episode "Marty's First Date", in desperation to retrieve his son from Cuba, Jay goes to Mexico City's "Linda Ronstadt International Airport" and marries a Mexican woman in order to travel there. She then admits to him that she is only marrying him "for citizenship" and then openly states "I plan to divorce him and take half his money." It is a possibility that this may be the "second divorce" Jay mentioned in the first webisode, but was never made clear. (see below).

In the second season, Jay's character was given a renovation. He received a rounder head, bigger pupils for his eyes and a warmer personality. He also begins a long-term relationship with Alice Tompkins, a Tennessee woman living in New York whom Jay meets on the street and later hires as his personal assistant.

In the opening sequence for every episode, Jay is awakened by a disquieting phone call or radio news brief. At the end, he is seen sitting in a movie theater, eating popcorn and drinking soda as the closing credits are shown on the screen. When the credits end, an usher approaches and says, "Excuse me sir, the show's over." Jay then delivers one of the following four responses:
 "Get away, zitface!"
 "Is the snack bar still open?"
 "But I have nowhere to go."
 "I'm stuck in the chair!"

Additionally, Jay shares a fifth response with Alice in the second season:
Usher: Excuse me, the show's over.
Alice: Get away, pipsqueak!
Jay: (to the camera) That's why I love her!

In the internet Web-Episode series that occurred after the show's cancellation, he is divorced (presumably from Alice) and is involved with his new make-up lady, Jennifer.

Martin Sherman

Voiced by Christine Cavanaugh
Jay's 12-year-old son Martin "Marty" usually stays with his mother, but visits Jay often.  Like Jay, he is overweight, which causes him problems at United Nations International School. He was, however, elected eighth-grade student body president thanks to a speech written by his father, dated Fidel Castro's granddaughter (even stowing away on her plane back to Cuba on in order to see her again), and discovered he has a gift for belly-dancing (he has great muscle control in his belly). In the second-season episode "From Chunk to Hunk", he lost a lot of weight, but found his new thin body to be more trouble than it was worth and gained it all back before the end of the episode.

Ardeth
Voiced by Brenda Vaccaro in season 1; Rhea Perlman in season 2
Jay's ex-wife, surname unknown, who fell in love with Jay as his nurse, during a period in which he was completely bandaged and gagged. She instantly regretted marrying Jay, admitting so during the wedding ceremony. They spent their wedding night playing The Newlywed Game, which they won (Jay correctly guessed Ardeth compared his sex appeal to a dead mackerel).

Ardeth is 35 years old and spends most of the series insulting Jay or demanding more alimony. At one point, when he greets her at a school athletic competition, she tells him he has to pay her $100 every time he talks to her. Handing her a wad of cash, he replies, "Fine. Here's two hundred. Get bent!" It is implied that Ardeth cheated on Jay with the judge who presided over their divorce case when, during the hearing, they make suggestive comments and flirtatious purring sounds to each other in front of Jay. She once attempted put a voodoo hex on Jay's girlfriend Alice, despite the divorce settlement specifically forbidding such actions. Despite her dislike of Jay, she shares Jay's affection for their only son Marty and even goes so far as to admit, "We raised a great kid."  She is often seen when Marty is in a show or event. She has a handsome rich personal trainer and boyfriend named Alberto.

Margo Sherman
Voiced by Nancy Cartwright
The younger child of the Sherman family, and the only biological child of Franklin and Eleanor. She is 17 years old and is a junior at Miss Hathaway's School for Untouched Girls. Margo is an activist who often protests her mother's socialite lifestyle. She also cares greatly for Jay, making sure his girlfriends are not just dating him to get good reviews and having him escort her to the debutante ball. Jay and her horse matters most to her. In the second-season episode "A Song for Margo", she briefly dated grunge rock singer Johnny Wrath (real name: Jonathan Rathberg) after he moved next door to the Shermans, and even considered losing her virginity to him, but discovers he was cheating on her and breaks up with him. She was redesigned for the second season.

Franklin Sherman
Voiced by Gerrit Graham
Jay's adoptive father and Eleanor's husband who speaks with a thick "Locust Valley lockjaw", wears slippers and always has a glass of brandy in his hand no matter where he goes. His mental health is uncertain, and he often acts quite erratically. He is a 64-year-old "rich eccentric". His family claims that he had a stroke (to which Eleanor adds "He didn't really. We just say that to explain his personality"). A few of his oddities include burning down the house (this is explained by him forgetting to turn the oven off), becoming stuck to an ice sculpture, gluing the dog and silverware to the ceiling, dressing up as the Energizer Bunny, rubbing his behind on the dinner plates, wearing underpants on his head at the dinner table, and sticking a banana in his ear which he claimed was an attempt to lure the monkey out of his head. He is also well known for dressing up as the New Year's Baby for the year 1937 and has destroyed both Picasso's Guernica and Michelangelo's The Creation of Adam via monster truck and helicopter respectively.

He is a former governor of New York, as well as a former ambassador, Cabinet member, a Rhodes scholar and a heavy contributor to the Republican Party. He was also U.S. Secretary of Balloon Doggies. When told by President George Bush that the position is a ridiculous figment of his imagination that Congress will no longer provide funding for, Sherman vehemently claims, "I didn't ask to be Secretary of Balloon Doggies, the balloon doggies demanded it." Franklin was Duke's running mate when he ran for president, though Duke tried to remove Franklin after a disastrous vice presidential debate, in which, among other gaffes, he claimed to be the first black female head of the Ku Klux Klan and that "America stinks!"

Despite his behavior, Franklin proves to be competent in some cases. In the episode "Marathon Mensch", he trains Jay to run in the New York marathon. Also in the episode "Frankie and Ellie Get Lost", much to his wife's surprise, Franklin proves that he can be a problem-solver and an apt handyman by building a shelter, a signal fire (to demand more rum from passing pilots), and training an ape as a butler.  In "Sherman of Arabia", he manages to get the president to lead a rescue mission for Jay due to his support for the Republicans. In the episode "Lady Hawke", it is revealed that gin is to Franklin what spinach is to Popeye the Sailor.

It was also revealed during a period newsreel from "Frankie and Ellie Get Lost" that he was completely sane and had never had a drop to drink in his life until Ted Kennedy spiked the punch at his wedding.

Eleanor Sherman (née Wigglesworth)
Voiced by Judith Ivey

Jay's adoptive mother and Franklin's wife, Eleanor is very prim and proper. She can be unscrupulous however, when it suits her purposes, such as willing to shoot her daughter's horse to force her to go to a debutante ball. She is often embarrassed by her family and its eccentricities, and is 63 years old. She seeks to have all poor people shot into space, and when she wrote a children's book about Jay called The Fat Little Pig, she promised to put all the profits toward that goal. She loves Jay but often shows humiliating photos of him. She is a little too concerned with her outward appearance, despite her lack of tear ducts and having the ability to cry bred out of her family, although in one episode she was seen crying after Jay yelled at her, so the lack of tear ducts may be a lie on her part. This is brought to light when she is asked how her skin is so smooth, and she replied that she scrubs her face rigorously with steel wool, and then soaks her face in boiling hot water for two minutes exactly. Eleanor's voice and many of her mannerisms were inspired by Katharine Hepburn.

Others

Duke Phillips 
Voiced by Charles Napier
Real name "Duke Scabies", Duke is Jay's boss, and head of Phillips Broadcasting (formerly Duke Phillips' House of Chicken and Waffles). He somewhat resembles Ted Turner and has a virtually superhuman constitution (he's able to lift Jay with relative ease and walk through concrete walls). He runs the network that shows Coming Attractions, and is always trying to change things to increase ratings and maximize profits. He owns an amusement park called Phillips Land, dubbed "The Happiest Place In Jersey", founded his own preschool ("Built on a dare"), runs PNN (Phillips News Network), and a hospital/medical research center (with a giant statue of himself on it chanting "All hail Duke. Duke is life"). He also tried to run for president with Franklin Sherman as his running mate. He is 39 years old possesses a hypnotic power called the "Evil eye" which he used to avoid reporters questions during that campaign. Contracted a fatal disease, later dubbed "Duke Phillips" disease; the treatment for which includes an 8-ounce injection of a medication discovered by Jay entitled "Jay Sherman's Oil" (a parody of Lorenzo's Oil) into his eyeball every four hours. He believes Jay is gay and in love with him, and wastes no opportunity to belittle him in public about this. Towards the end of the series, he marries Alice Tompkins' sister Miranda. When asked about religion, Duke commented that he, along with the rest of America's cultural elite, worships Pan, the goat god. Also, pigeons love the sound of his voice, as when he once spoke to explain it, a pigeon flew into his mouth. He has a secret love of cats, and in the episode "All the Duke's Men", a videotape of him tearfully singing to his cat is used by Bob Dole to discourage Duke from running as a Republican. Duke loves America, but for tax purposes is a citizen of the Dutch Antilles.

Jeremy Hawke
Voiced by Maurice LaMarche
Jeremy is an Australian actor, and is Jay's best friend since Jay gave his first film its only positive review. Best known as the star of the "illogical, blasphemous, and ultra-violent" Crocodile Gandhi series, he has starred in multiple action films and played former president James Monroe (as a spoof of James Bond e.g. "Monroe, James Monroe"). He has a twin sister, Olivia Newton-Hawke (Morwenna Banks), who tries to win Jay's affection. He is a combination spoof of Australians Paul Hogan in terms of the exaggerated accent, and Mel Gibson with his luck with the ladies as well as his action film roles. His hidden shames: he's 43, uses elevator shoes to give the illusion of height, had allegedly fired a caterer for bringing the wrong kind of biscuit and has had extensive plastic surgery. He can also imitate the voice of Bullwinkle J. Moose.

Doris Grossman
Voiced by Doris Grau
Doris is Jay's make-up artist. She is a 65-year-old chain smoker, only has one lung and anytime a cigarette is removed from her mouth a new one appears. In the episode "Every Doris Has Her Day", there was a possibility that she was Jay's biological mother (there are many similarities between his circumstances and her own son whom she gave up for adoption), but was proven not to be from a DNA test. She also tries to be attractive to Duke, by purring to him and sending him nude photos of herself. Doris lives in a very spacious and luxurious apartment, affordable to her since it has been "rent controlled since 1946", and also for the fact that Duke pays her $300,000 per annum, believing that this was what average people earned. Her rent is $120 per month. She says that one of her talents is making shapes out of cigarette smoke, but when she tried to make a bunny she created one with a demonic face which told her "Doris... Tick! Tock!" She was once a Commercial actress for Phleghm Fatale Cigarettes, but her career in acting ended after she "got knocked up by the Fruit of the Loom banana." Doris was once married to horror-movie actor Lon Chaney as evidenced on her arm tattoo.

Alice and Penny Tompkins
Voiced by Park Overall (Alice) and Russi Taylor (Penny)
Introduced in the second-season episode "Sherman, Woman and Child", Alice Tompkins becomes Jay's girlfriend. She is named for Alice Kramden on The Honeymooners. She is 32 years old, and is initially married to a country singer, Cyrus Tompkins, but she leaves him when she begins to suspect he is cheating on her (she reaches this conclusion after seeing Cyrus' album, entitled "I'm Being Unfaithful to My Wife, Alice Tompkins. You Heard Me, Alice Tompkins.") As a consequence, Alice moves to New York from Knoxville, Tennessee, to show her 5-year-old daughter Penny that a woman can make it without a man.  He later tracks her to New York and tries to seduce her, but his attempts get thwarted by Jay. She has an older sister named Miranda, named after the heroine of William Shakespeare's The Tempest and who has usurped her popularity many times over the years, and a younger brother named Bisquick.

Alice was originally an artist and is capable of perfectly replicating art masterworks on the walls of her apartment (such as Michelangelo‘s  The Creation of Adam and Georges-Pierre Seurat's A Sunday Afternoon on the Island of La Grande Jatte). She pepper-sprayed Jay upon first meeting him on the street, an act he shrugged off (even enjoyed). She then accepted Jay's offer to work as his personal assistant. It is in the episode "Lady Hawke" that she realizes she has fallen in love with Jay, and the two become a couple at the end of the episode.

Despite hitting him when she first met him for not liking The Lion King, Penny quickly takes a liking to Jay, initially calling him "funny man" due to the comically painful mishaps that repeatedly befall him when he is around her. Later in the season, she begins to call him "Uncle Jay." When he and Alice are unable to get her admitted into any of the top preschools in New York, Duke Phillips founds one exclusively for her, staffed by Jimmy Breslin, Sean Young, and Prince Charles.

A fifth tagline for the closing credits was created to go with the original four (see Jay above). Here, Jay and Alice are seen kissing in the theater seats as the credits roll. At the end, they are interrupted by an usher (a different one for this scene) who says, "Excuse me, the show's over." Alice responds, "Get away, pipsqueak!" and Jay says to the camera, "That's why I love her!"

In the first Critic webisode, Jay's makeup artist Jennifer asks him what happened to his self-esteem, to which Jay replies that he lost it in the second divorce settlement. Although Alice is not mentioned by name, this led many fans to believe that Jay and Alice had married and eventually ended up in a bitter divorce.

Vlada and Zoltan Veramirovich
Voiced by Nick Jameson
Vlada, who is a 40-year-old Eastern-European immigrant, runs a restaurant called L'ane Riche (French for "The Wealthy Jackass"), which Jay and Jeremy both frequent. He hates Jay, but loves his money. During the series most of his wealth is thanks to Jay's appetite and when Jay dieted they couldn't afford Harvard for Zoltan, his equally effeminate and disturbing son. Also according to Zoltan that they bought a yacht as a result of Jay's appetite. Vlada frequently makes insulting remarks about Jay to the restaurant staff or quietly directs them to give him a bad table and poor-quality food. Best known for his greeting to Jay, "Ahhh, Meeester Sherman!" he has a keen understanding of who is hot and who is not in New York and a posse built for schmoozing. Zoltan attends the same UN School as Jay's son Marty and sings unintentionally hilarious songs about his homeland. Principal Mangosuthu, the headmaster of the UN School, once described Zoltan as "The boy who used to be a girl. Oops, that used to be a secret!..." During the UN Olympics, he and his son wear Pottsylvania jerseys. L'ane Riche is a parody of Sardi's of New York, which is frequented by Broadway stars and New York socialites alike.

Principal Mangosuthu
Voiced by Maurice LaMarche
Mangosuthu is the principal of United Nations International School. He is African and can be sarcastic and scornful, often ending his remarks with a loud, bellowing laugh. He is known for making numerous yet ridiculous puns. In "A Day at the Races and a Night at the Opera", he comments on the track-and-field day as: "Like the real UN, there was a lot of heated gibberish but nothing was accomplished, and we send the bill to Uncle Sam." Also in "From Chunk to Hunk", he makes a pun on a video of President Clinton falling through his floor: "I'm sure we all appreciate President Clinton's 'groundbreaking' message."

Shackleford
Voiced by Maurice LaMarche
The Shermans' butler, Shackleford is a 61-year-old Englishman with a dour, sarcastic attitude. He is not particularly loyal to the family; exampled when he watched the house burn down yelling "Burn, Baby! Burn!" after Franklin left the stove on causing it to burn down. but he stays with them for the money and fringe benefits. Shackleford is particularly contemptuous toward Jay, referring to him as "Adopted Master Jay", with a tone that suggest that he does not consider Jay to be a true member of the family (yet he does appear with the family waiting for Jay to finish the New York Marathon). He is also a fan of grunge rock and has worked for a number of famous musical groups. He has an ape counterpart named Shackleape who hates Franklin and tries to eat both Frankiln and Jay at the end of "Frankie and Ellie Get Lost". Shackleford was inspired by John Gielgud as the Butler Hobson in the film Arthur.

Humphrey the Hippo
Voiced by Tress MacNeille
A parody of Barney the Dinosaur, Humphrey is a popular children's host dressed as a giant green hippo who, like Barney, sings bland, sugary children's songs like "Ho, Ho, Ho, Stick Out your Toe; Hee, Hee, Hee,  Stick Out Your Knee." Unfortunately for Jay, the Humphrey the Hippo Show airs directly opposite from Jay's show, stealing one of Jay's largest demographics: young preschoolers children who love Jay because he resembles Pillsbury Doughboy. Naturally, Franklin is a big fan of the show too. Humphrey's unseen pals are parodies themselves of real-life personalities, including Rabbit De Niro, Burt Baccaracoon, and Robin the Bloodsucking Leech. While children love the show—when Jay made Humphrey sad, outraged children demanded his thumbs be broken—the kids who co-star with Humphrey rejoice when they think Humphrey is dead in one episode ("No more stupid songs!") In the episode "A Little Deb Will Do Ya", the woman who plays Humphrey reveals she's sexually attracted to Jay – presumably, her infatuation ended after sleeping with Jay; she remarked, "It's amazing someone so inadequate in bed can be so relaxed and unconcerned." Humphrey once unwisely had a foul-mouthed Madonna as a guest host ("Hey, do you eat with that mouth?!") and later when bought by a cigarette company started advising kids to start smoking, reassuring them when they "get a lung removed", they got free ice cream.

The Devil
Appearing in several episodes, Jay blames him for many of Hollywood's problems (such as unnecessary sequels and Cher winning an Oscar, although he's only the reason Marisa Tomei won). He was once contacted by the cast of Wings, who wanted to stay on the air for another year (his response was "Tell them there are limits to even my powers!"). He also disguised himself as a potential replacement for Roger Ebert. After hearing his positive reviews of Disney movies, Gene Siskel replied, "You're Satan, aren't you?"

Guest stars
Throughout the show's run, other famous critics also guest-voiced as themselves. Gene Shalit and Rex Reed appeared in multiple episodes. Shalit even appeared in a webisode. The duo Gene Siskel and Roger Ebert also appeared in a special second-season episode "Siskel & Ebert & Jay & Alice."

Other famous media personalities voicing themselves included Geraldo Rivera, Adam West, Kareem Abdul-Jabbar, Jimmy Breslin, Bob Costas, Rod Steiger, Steve Allen, Ricki Lake, Queen Latifah, June Lockhart, and Milton Berle.

Celebrities impersonated

 Michael Jackson
 Elvis Presley
 Lisa Marie Presley
 Cher
 Arnold Schwarzenegger
 Howard Stern
 William Shatner
 Robert Redford
 Demi Moore
 Dudley Moore as Arthur
 Al Pacino
 Dennis Hopper
 Keanu Reeves
 Vanilla Ice
 DeForest Kelley
 Sharon Stone
 Al Sharpton
 Conan O'Brien
 Ed Koch
 Woody Allen
 Fidel Castro
 Orson Welles
 Madonna
 Bill Cosby

References

Critic
Critic
The Critic